The Belfast–Newry line (known as the Portadown line by NI Railways) operates from  station in County Antrim to Newry in County Down, Northern Ireland. Newry is on the fringe of the network, being the last stop before the border with the Republic of Ireland. The line follows the route of the northern half of the main Dublin–Belfast line, with the exception of calling at Belfast Great Victoria Street.

Northern Ireland Railways operates an intensive local service on this line between Belfast and Lisburn, with other services operating to and from Portadown.  Local services are operated with C3K trains, constructed by CAF, Spain.  A less intensive local service operates from Newry, with only four local services a day operating from there. A single service operated by Iarnród Éireann also runs on weekday mornings between Newry and Dublin Connolly along the Belfast–Dublin line, calling at all stations in between.

The Enterprise also serves Lurgan and Lisburn at scheduled frequencies on Sundays. This service is operated in partnership with Iarnród Éireann .

Translink announced in March 2006 that planning permission was sought from Newry and Mourne District Council to construct a new railway station to the east of the existing station at Newry.  Platform improvement and extension is proposed, as are replacement canopies, a track maintenance building and a new 'Park and Ride' facility.  Alongside this, a major upgrade is currently taking place to refurbish all the stations on this line with the exception of Bangor, Lanyon Place and Great Victoria Street.  This project is estimated to cost £7 million

Most NIR services continue on through Great Victoria Street and stop at stations on the Bangor line before terminating at Bangor.

Route

Belfast

Belfast Central Railway 
The line snakes its way through an S-shaped cutting until it reaches Botanic station, where passengers intending for Queen's University Belfast and Botanic Gardens alight. The line enters the 270 metre-long Botanic Tunnel, which takes it under Botanic Avenue, University Road, and Lisburn Road (where Windsor railway station was located until its closure in 1885), after which it emerges just before City Hospital station. Crossing under Donegall Road, the line splits in two at City Junction, with most trains veering right along the Blythefield Curve to reach the triple track at Westlink Junction that takes them to Great Victoria Street. Trains reverse at Great Victoria Street and then proceed back down the triple track as far as Westlink Junction, but then carry on straight to Central Junction where there is a chord connecting to City Junction allowing trains- normally the Enterprise- to bypass Great Victoria Street. This arrangement creates a triangular junction with City Junction at the east corner, Westlink junction at the north and Central Junction at the south.

Great Northern Mainline 
The line continues south from Central Junction, running through the numerous residential lands of South Belfast and roughly following the route of the A1 road. Immediately after Central Junction it passes under the Donegall Road once more as well as Tate's Avenue, before passing behind Windsor Park and reaching Adelaide halt, where a maintenance depot built on the site of the former freight yard is located. Continuing south, Lislea Drive sidings are passed on the right before the line crosses Stockman's Lane (Part of the Outer Ring) and passes Balmoral halt, Musgrave Park Hospital, and then Finaghy halt. At Finaghy is evidence of the GNR's plan to upgrade the line to quadruple track, with the Finaghy Road North bridge having been built with two double-track arches. The line then passes under the M1 motorway and Black's Road before reaching Dunmurry halt. The only level crossing between Belfast and Lisburn is located in Dunmurry on the Glebe Road, with a passenger foot crossing adjacent at Sunnymede Park. After passing over the Kingsway, Derriaghy halt is reached, and shortly thereafter, Lambeg and, the final intermediate halt on this section, Hilden. Entering Lisburn city proper, the line skirts Wallace Park before arriving at Lisburn railway station itself.

Lisburn 
A small yard exists at Lisburn station, typically used by permanent way vehicles and, until recently, the storage of redundant stock. Lisburn is also the junction for the single-track Antrim branch, which runs adjacent to the double-track Newry line through the Lisburn suburbs, creating the illusion of triple-track. These lines pass under Thiepval Road and Causeway End Road in a deep cutting before reaching the former site of the second Knockmore halt, staggered across the Ballinderry Road bridge and demolished in 2014. After passing under the Knockmore Road, future site of Lisburn West railway station and site of the original Kockmore station, the Antrim Branch diverges to the right. Prior to 1956, this was also the junction for the Banbridge, Lisburn and Belfast Junction Railway's line to Hillsborough, Dromore, Banbridge and onwards to Castlewellan and Newcastle. This part of line runs through an industrial estate, with the Coca-Cola bottling plant to the right. The section between Lisburn and Moira is generally flat and straight. After crossing the Lissue Road on the level trains pass the former site of Damhead halt, and before reaching Moira will have passed other former halts at Broomhedge and Maze. The line then crosses the A26 Glenavy Road and enters Moira station.

Moira 
Moira boasts the oldest extant railway building in Ulster, and along with Lisburn is an excellent example of restored GNR architecture. Immediately after leaving the station the line crosses the Lagan Canal on the Askew Bridge, and then runs parallel to the M1 motorway as far as Kilmore, where the railway passes under it. Kilmore is the site of the short-lived Pritchard's Bridge railway station, with the rest of the way to Lurgan being composed largely of agricultural land. Entering Lurgan from the north-east, the line crosses the Antrim Road and Lake Street on the level before passing under the Kilmaine footbridge and reaching Lurgan station.

Lurgan 
Lurgan station was briefly known as Craigavon East for a time back in the 1970s. Immediately after the station, the line crosses William Street on the level and proceeds through the Lurgan suburbs, passing under the Eastway and running on a causeway between the two balancing lakes at Craigavon. Running behind Rushmere shopping centre, the line comes parallel with the Northway. It then passes under the M12 motorway and the site of the former Goodyear halt (Which served the nearby Goodyear Tire factory), and slightly further down the line, the site of the former Seagoe station, which was a temporary terminus during construction of the line to Portadown. The site of the first and third Portadown stations is passed, which today is a small maintenance yard with a siding. The line crosses its first, and only river- The Bann- and arrives at Portadown station.

Portadown 
The current (Fourth) Portadown station is on the same site as the second one, and was formerly the junction between the mainline and the lines to Armagh and Derry Foyle Road. For a time in the 1970s it was known as Craigavon West. Most non-Enterprise trains, save for couple of peak commuter services, terminate here. The line leaves Portadown by means of a 90° curve to the southeast, adjacent to Portadown South Sidings, and once free of the suburbs runs parallel to the Cusher River, Newry Canal and River Bann as far Moneypenny's Lock, where the latter leaves the railway and veers towards Gilford. Continuing alongside the Canal towpath, the line runs through agricultural surroundings as it passes the former site of Tanderagee station, closed in 1965, before reaching Scarva station.

Scarva 
Scarva was formerly the junction with the line to Banbridge via Laurencetown, which closed in 1955. The line continues out of Scarva station, still following the Newry Canal past Lough Shark and bypassing the village of Acton shortly before reaching Poyntzpass station.

Poyntzpass 
Poyntzpass station retains a single siding, used by NIR as a loading point for ballast trains with stone brought in by road from a quarry near Banbridge. Poyntzpass is also home to the only GNR signal cabin still in its original location on NIR. The line continues to hug the Newry Canal, crossing it twice about halfway between Poyntzpass and Jerretspass. On the approach to Newry, the remains of Goraghwood railway station, once an important junction with the lines to Armagh and Warrenpoint, are passed, whilst the railway and canal part ways. The railway crosses the A28 and then the 18-arch Craigmore Viaduct, which takes it into Newry station.

Newry 
Newry is the terminus of all local NIR trains, with the only trains extending further being the Enterprise and a daily Iarnród Éireann commuter service to Dublin. The line carries on south, crossing the A25 on MacNeill's Egyptian Arch. The embankment the railway is carried on soon becomes a cutting and the line is crossed by the A1 dual carriageway, the main road from the North to Dublin. From here the two run parallel as far as Cloughoge Chapel, where the railway diverges into another cutting before diving under the A1 again just north of Killeen. The railway then bypasses Meigh, in the shadow of Slieve Gullion, and passes the site of the long-closed station at Adavoyle. Finally, at Milepost 59 1/2, the line crosses the border and becomes Iarnród Éireann's Northern Line.

Newry Canal Towpath
Passengers can alight at Portadown, Scarva and Poyntzpass to access the towpath of the Newry Canal.

Gallery

References

External links
Northern Ireland Railways page on Belfast-Newry line
Northern Ireland Railways page on Cross Border (Enterprise) line
Northern Ireland Railways page on the Enterprise Service to Dublin Connolly

Great Northern Railway (Ireland)
Railway lines in Northern Ireland
Transport in Belfast
Transport in County Antrim
Transport in County Down
Transport in County Armagh
Newry